Kitasatospora indigofera is a bacterial species of the genus Kitasatospora.

References

Further reading

External links
Type strain of Streptomyces indigoferus at BacDive -  the Bacterial Diversity Metadatabase	

Streptomycineae
Bacteria described in 1960